Four male athletes from Morocco competed at the 1996 Summer Paralympics in Atlanta, United States.

See also
Morocco at the Paralympics
Morocco at the 1996 Summer Olympics

References

Nations at the 1996 Summer Paralympics
1996
Summer Paralympics